Rgya Gram Shad (Unicode ) is a character in the Tibetan character set. The character is a punctuation mark, an elaborate form of danda, used to signify the endings of paragraphs in Tibetan Buddhist texts.

References 

Tibetan script